Delta Boys is a 2016 South Korean musical comedy-drama film directed by Ko Bong-soo.

Plot
Four hopeless men who live at the bottom of the social ladder get together to take part in a quartet contest.

Cast
Baek Seung-hwan as Kang Il-rok
Lee Woong-bin as Cha Ye-gun 
Shin Min-jae as Choi Dae-yong
Kim Choong-gil as No Joon-se 
Youn Ji-hye as Ji-hye

Awards and nominations

References

External links

2016 films
South Korean comedy-drama films
2010s South Korean films